KBKI-LD, virtual and UHF digital channel 27, is a low-powered television station licensed to Boise, Idaho, United States. The station is owned by the DTV America subsidiary of HC2 Holdings.

History 
The station's construction permit was initially issued on February 25, 2010 under the calls of K27KI-D and changed to the current callsign of KBKI-LD.

Digital channels
The station's digital signal is multiplexed:

References

External links
DTV America 

Low-power television stations in the United States
Innovate Corp.
BKI-LD
Television channels and stations established in 2010
2010 establishments in Idaho